Dictyotenguna angusta is a species of planthopper native to Guangxi, China.  General coloration is green.  Males measure 14.6 millimeters long with 11.5 millimeter forewings, and females measure 17.3 millimeters long with 14.1 millimeter wings.  The name is derived from Greek angusta, meaning "narrow" or "slender".

References

Insects of China
Insects described in 2014
Dictyopharinae